Lucien Anderson (June 23, 1824 – October 18, 1898) was a pro-Unionist slave owner and United States Representative from Kentucky.

Biography
Anderson was born near Mayfield, Kentucky. The spelling of his first name is disputed; his official Congressional biography and many contemporaneous accounts spelled it, "Lucien," but some modern biographers claim the original spelling was, "Lucian." 

He attended the public schools and studied law. In 1845, he was admitted to the bar and commenced practice in Mayfield.  He served in local office including Graves County Attorney.

Anderson served as a Presidential Elector on the Whig ticket of Winfield Scott and William A. Graham in 1852. He served as a member of the Kentucky House of Representatives from 1855 to 1857

He was elected as an Unconditional Unionist to the Thirty-eighth Congress (March 4, 1863 – March 3, 1865). Shortly following his election, he was kidnapped by Confederate sympathizers, but then released in a prisoner swap for some Confederate prisoners.  While in Congress, he advocated for the emancipation of all slaves and voted for the 13th Amendment to the US Constitution, despite having been a slave-owner, possibly even at the time of his voting for the Amendment.

He declined to be a candidate for renomination in 1864. He also served as a delegate to the Republican National Convention in 1864.  

After leaving Congress, Anderson resumed the practice of law. Near the end of his life he was judged to be of unsound mind as the result of his age and ill health, and a trustee was appointed to manage his affairs. He died in Mayfield, Kentucky, on October 17, 1898 and was buried in the Anderson family cemetery.

Anderson is the subject of a biography, 2016's Unconditional Unionist: The Hazardous Life of Lucian Anderson, Kentucky Congressman, by Berry Craig and Dieter C. Ullrich.

References

Sources
 Hood, James Larry. "For the Union: Kentucky's Unconditional Unionist Congressmen and the Development of the Republican Party in Kentucky, 1863-1865." Register of the Kentucky Historical Society 76 (July 1978): 197-215.

External links

Notes

1824 births
1898 deaths
People from Graves County, Kentucky
Kentucky Whigs
Kentucky Unionists
Unconditional Union Party members of the United States House of Representatives from Kentucky
Kentucky Republicans
Members of the Kentucky House of Representatives
Kentucky lawyers
19th-century American politicians
19th-century American lawyers
Members of the United States House of Representatives from Kentucky